Kelly Garni is an American hard rock musician and photographer, best known as a founding member of the band Quiet Riot. He appears on the band's 1978 self-titled debut album as well as their second album, Quiet Riot II, released the same year.

Biography
Born in Los Angeles on October 29th, 1957, Garni's family moved to Burbank, California in the early 1970s, where he met and went on to co-found Quiet Riot with guitarist Randy Rhoads. Garni played bass in the band for about five years until he was fired over an altercation with singer Kevin DuBrow, whom Garni believed was holding the band back. 

Garni is now an artist and the author of two books. His first book, "Angels With Dirty Faces", is a biography about the formation of Quiet Riot and his 14-year friendship with Rhoads in the 1970s Hollywood Sunset Strip music scene. His second book, "Naked Vegas" is about his 20-year photography career in Las Vegas. He currently resides in Nevada.

Discography 
 Quiet Riot (1978)
 Quiet Riot II (1978)
 The Randy Rhoads Years (1993)
 Xcursion (1985)
 No Sky Today

References

External links 
 
 Ghost Town Art & Coffee Co.
 Interview about Quiet Riot's early years
 https://www.youtube.com/watch?v=CD9K8kbfDhE
 http://www.knac.com/article.asp?ArticleID=9193

Garni, Kelly
Garni, Kelly
Quiet Riot members
American heavy metal bass guitarists
American male bass guitarists
American rock bass guitarists